Yositaka is a masculine Japanese given name. Notable people with the name include:

Given name
 Yositaka Adachi (born 1962), Palauan-Japanese Former Governor of Koror State

See also
 Yoshitaka

Japanese masculine given names